The Flatiron is the name for an eroded volcanic outcrop in east-central British Columbia, Canada, located in Wells Gray Provincial Park.

It is flanked by Hemp Creek to the west and Trout Creek to the east.

Geology
About 200,000 years ago, a lake formed in the Hemp Canyonlands with its upper end near the meeting of Trout and Hemp creeks. The surface of the lake was the rim of the Hemp cliffs a few kilometres south of The Flatiron. The lake was created by a blockage downstream on the Clearwater River, but its actual location is unknown, and this could have been an ice dam, a landslide or a lava flow. The Flatiron erupted into this lake and was once much bigger than today. This action is called a ponded lava flow. The lava used to extend right across the Hemp Creek Valley, but floods from melting glaciers carried away the lava and left The Flatiron as a remnant. The water flow might have been 100 times the size of Hemp Creek today. The lava that is exposed today cooled very slowly and formed into columns, one of the park’s finest examples of columnar basalt. The columns that make up the Flatiron have been falling away regularly and piling up at the base, so the Flatiron keeps gets thinner.

Access
A one-hour hike from Clearwater Valley Road (also called Wells Gray Park Road) leads to a viewpoint of the Hemp Canyonlands with the Flatiron in the distance. After another 30 minutes hiking, it is necessary to leave the trail and bushwhack to the base of the Flatiron. As the cliffs almost surround the Flatiron, the only access to the top is a scramble from the west side above Hemp Creek.

References

See also
List of volcanoes in Canada
Volcanism of Canada
Volcanism of Western Canada

Wells Gray-Clearwater
Volcanoes of British Columbia
Pleistocene volcanoes
Monogenetic volcanoes